This is a list of airlines currently operating in Réunion.

See also
 List of airlines
 List of defunct airlines of Africa

Aviation in Réunion
Reunion
Reunion
Airlines

Airlines